The Fixtape Vol. 1: Smoke on This is a solo album by Krayzie Bone. It was his first 'street' album, released by RBC Records, and has since been followed by three further volumes. He explained the album's title: "It's not a mixtape and it isn't a whole new album; it's somewhere in the middle, so I called it a 'fixtape'". The track "Stay Down" features a guest appearance from Akon.

The album received a 'Large' rating from XXL magazine, in whose view its "misses slightly outweigh its hits".

Track listing

References

2008 mixtape albums
Krayzie Bone albums
Gangsta rap albums by American artists